Best of Crystal Kay is Crystal Kay's second greatest hits album. It was released on September 2, 2009. The release of this album marked the 10th anniversary of Kay's career in the music industry on the label Sony Music Entertainment Japan. This compilation consists of Kay's hit songs and more, as well as a third disc with new tracks.

The album was certified Gold for shipment of 100,000 copies.

Track listing

Charting and release 
"Best of Crystal Kay" entered the Oricon Daily Chart at #2, and sold 26,929 units that day. The album ultimately dropped to #3 on the Weekly Chart, behind Superfly's Box Emotions and the third week sales of Arashi's All the Best! 1999-2009, selling 87,669 copies. This is Kay's best peak position on the Oricon Chart since All Yours in 2007, as well as her best first week sales since Call me Miss... in 2006.

Oricon sales chart

Various charts

Release history 
Limited edition

Standard edition

References 

2009 greatest hits albums
Crystal Kay albums
Japanese-language albums
Epic Records compilation albums